Giuseppe Bianchi may refer to:

Giuseppe Bianchi (abbot), 17th-century abbot
Giuseppe Bianchi (architect), 18th-century Italian architect
Giuseppe Bianchi (astronomer) (1791–1866), Italian astronomer
Giuseppe Bianchi (engineer) (1888–1969), Italian railway engineer
Giuseppe Bianchi (musician), Italian musician